Russell High School is a public high school for girls, located in the city of Pietermaritzburg, KwaZulu-Natal, South Africa.

History
On 23 January 1879, Robert Russell the Superintendent inspector for education in the Natal colony, placed an advertisement in the newspaper for a new school called the Model primary school for girls, it would later be changed into a high school. The school opened on 6 March 1879 in a single storey building on the corner of Berg and Chapel streets (later renamed Peter Kerchoff and Hoosen Haffejee), making it the oldest girls' only public school in Kwazulu-Natal. The school had 3 teachers and 169 pupils with Mrs. Eleanor Broome appointed as the school's first principal.

The current school building was built in 1897.In 1941, the school was renamed Russell high school, to honour the founder of the school, Robert Russell. In 1979, on the schools centenary year, the school building was named as a national monument.

Academics
The school offers a full academic programme with extended drama and arts subjects. It is also one of the few schools that offer German(2nd language) as a subject. The school offers the following subjects:
 English and Zulu Home Language
 Zulu First Additional Language
 Afrikaans First Additional Language
 Life Sciences
 Physical Science
 Mathematics and Mathematical Literacy
 Computer Applications Technology
 Visual Arts
 Dramatic Arts
 Accounting
 Business Studies
 Geography
 Hospitality Studies

The following extramural and leadership opportunities are currently offered at the school:
 Rotary Interact
 Student Christian Association
 Audio Visual Society
 Grade 11 Fundraising
 Quiz Team
 Public Speaking
 Library
 Safety and Security Committee
 Russell Mentors
 Representative Council for Learners
 Leadership Courses
 Service Club

Sports
The school offers the following sports:
 Hockey
 Netball
 Basketball
 Softball
 Bowls
 Soccer
 Inter-house programmes
 Fun Run
 Dancing

Notable Alumnae
Jo-anne Reyneke - Actress & presenter

References

http://russellhigh.co.za

Schools in South Africa